The 2013 Tampere Open was a professional tennis tournament played on clay courts. It was the 32nd edition of the tournament which was part of the 2013 ATP Challenger Tour and the 2013 ITF Women's Circuit. It took place in Tampere, Finland, on 22–28 July 2013.

Men's singles main draw entrants

Seeds 

 1 Rankings as of 15 July 2013

Other entrants 
The following players received wildcards into the singles main draw:
  Micke Kontinen
  Herkko Pöllänen
  Joel Popov
  Henrik Sillanpää

The following players received entry from the qualifying draw:
  Maxim Dubarenco
  Markus Eriksson
  Thomas Schoorel
  Andrew Whittington

The following player received entry as a lucky loser:
  Patrik Rosenholm

Women's singles main draw entrants

Seeds 

 1 Rankings as of 15 July 2013

Other entrants 
The following players received wildcards into the singles main draw:
  Ella Leivo
  Milka-Emilia Pasanen
  Annika Sillanpää
  Tanja Tuomi

The following players received entry from the qualifying draw:
  Johanna Hyöty
  Julia Klackenberg
  Antonina Lysakova
  Eva Paalma
  Zhanna Panfilkina
  Oleksandra Piskun
  Tina Schiechtl
  Nina Zander

Champions

Men's singles 

  Jesse Huta Galung def.  Maxime Teixeira 6–4, 6–3

Women's singles 

  Karen Barbat def.  Liubov Vasilyeva 6–1, 7–6(7–5)

Men's doubles 

  Henri Kontinen /  Goran Tošić def.  Ruben Gonzales /  Chris Letcher 6–4, 6–4

Women's doubles 

  Julia Wachaczyk /  Nina Zander def.  Emma Laine /  Piia Suomalainen 6–4, 6–4

External links 
  

2013
2013 ATP Challenger Tour
2013 ITF Women's Circuit
Tennis tournaments in Finland
2013 in Finnish sport